The Rice–SMU football rivalry was an American college football rivalry between the Rice University Owls and Southern Methodist University Mustangs. The game was first played in 1916, and since 1998 the winner was awarded the Mayor's Cup. SMU leads the series 48–41–1.

History
The football squads of Rice University and Southern Methodist University, two of the smallest schools in NCAA Division I FBS, first played in 1916, with Rice winning 127–3. In 1918, both schools joined the Southwest Conference, and from 1926 they played every year except for 1987 and 1988, after the NCAA gave SMU's football program the "death penalty" following a cheating scandal. They played in the same conference until 2012, beginning with the Southwest (1918–1995), then the Western Athletic Conference (1996–2005) and Conference USA (2005–2012). In that time they had met 90 times, with SMU leading 48–41–1.

Mayor's Cup
In 1998 a traveling trophy, the "Mayor's Cup", was introduced to the series, and has been awarded to the winner each year. The Owls currently hold the trophy after the 2012 game and lead the trophy series 9–6. However, the future of the trophy is unclear, as SMU left Conference USA for the American Athletic Conference for the 2013 season, and no future games are scheduled. On June 15, 2022, Rice announced they will be officially joining the American Athletic Conference for the 2023 season, renewing the series. On November 9, 2022, the American Athletic Conference announced the football scheduling model for the 2023–26 seasons, with Rice–SMU scheduled to meet in 2023, 2024, and 2026.

Game results

See also  
 List of NCAA college football rivalry games

References

College football rivalries in the United States
Rice Owls football
SMU Mustangs football
Recurring events established in 1916
1916 establishments in Texas